Giesbergeria voronezhensis is a Gram-negative, spiral-shaped and motile bacterium from the genus of Giesbergeria which has been isolated from activated sludge from Voronezh in Russia.

References 

Comamonadaceae
Bacteria described in 2006